Cut and Blind is the debut EP by American singer-songwriter Joseph Arthur, released in August 1996 on Sell My Soup Records. The EP was entirely self-produced, with Arthur performing each instrument and creating the artwork in his home. The song "Pick Up the Phone" is an early version of "History", later re-recorded for his second studio album, Come to Where I'm From (2000). The other three songs would appear on his debut album Big City Secrets (1997), with "Mikel K" and "Porcupine" appearing as re-recorded versions.

Reception
Cut and Blind subsequently lead to Arthur signing to Peter Gabriel's label, Real World Records. In 2011, Arthur noted, "I passed it out to a few people and it ended up in Peter Gabriel’s hands completely randomly."

Track listing

Personnel
 Joseph Arthur – vocals, guitars, pianoforte

References

Joseph Arthur albums
1996 debut EPs